Dance Raja Dance is a 1987 Indian Kannada-language dance film, directed and produced by Dwarakish for his Dwarakish Chitra banner. The film stars newcomers Vinod Raj, Divya and Sangeetha.

The film released to positive response by critics and audience and the lead star Vinod Raj was lauded for his dancing skills. For this movie, the climax was shot by helicopter, apart from that they used five cameras to shoot this climax scene. Actually it was Dwarakish's Dream to shoot Mysore from an aerial angle. He dropped that idea due to a financial crisis. But the then Chief minister Ramakrishna Hegde learned of this dream and he helped Dwarakish to do so. He called his minister Siddaramaiah to go to Mysore with a helicopter. He went with the helicopter and told Dwarakish to utilize the helicopter.

The song "Dance Dance Raja Dance" from this film was included in the widely popular video game Grand Theft Auto: Liberty City Stories along with few other Indian songs in a radio channel Radio Del Mundo.

Soundtrack 
The music was composed by Vijaya Anand, with lyrics by Chi. Udaya Shankar and R. N. Jayagopal. Music director A. R. Rahman, who was Dilip then, had assisted Vijaya Anand on the keyboards.

References

External links 
 

1987 films
1980s dance films
1980s Kannada-language films
Indian dance films
Films directed by Dwarakish